1883 was the 97th season of cricket in England since the foundation of Marylebone Cricket Club (MCC). There was the first of four successive titles won by Notts, and the beginning of the "Great Revival" of Surrey, who had been among the weaker counties since 1866.

Champion County

 Nottinghamshire

Playing record (by county)

Leading batsmen (qualification 20 innings)

Leading bowlers (qualification 1,000 balls)

Notable Events
 30 January – England won the deciding match of the scheduled three-Test series in Melbourne (although an additional match was arranged later).  Some ladies burned the bails and placed the resultant ashes in a small urn.  This was presented to England's captain, Ivo Bligh, who had promised to "recover those ashes".  The urn is kept in a glass case at Lord's but England and Australia have been playing for the Ashes ever since.
 25 May – Surrey, in a season that marked their revival from a lowly position since 1866 to the champion eleven of the late 1880s and early 1890s, break the record highest team total in county cricket by scoring 650 against Hampshire.
 George Harrison became the first bowler to take 100 wickets in the season in which he made his debut in first-class cricket.
 George Ulyett scored 1,562 runs with a highest score of 84. Not until Charles Harris in 1935 did a player scoring no centuries score more runs in a season.
 Ulyett's feat of getting within eleven runs of the leading scorer with no centuries has been approached since only by David Green in 1965.

Notes
An unofficial seasonal title sometimes proclaimed by consensus of media and historians prior to December 1889 when the official County Championship was constituted. Although there are ante-dated claims prior to 1873, when residence qualifications were introduced, it is only since that ruling that any quasi-official status can be ascribed.

References

Annual reviews
 John Lillywhite's Cricketer's Companion (Green Lilly), Lillywhite, 1884
 James Lillywhite's Cricketers' Annual (Red Lilly), Lillywhite, 1884
 John Wisden's Cricketers' Almanack, 1884

External links
 CricketArchive – season summaries

1883 in English cricket
English cricket seasons in the 19th century